María Esperanza Jacqueline Andere-Aguilar (born August 20, 1938) is a Mexican actress.

Life and career 

Andere was born in a Jewish family located Mexico City on August 20 1938. Her appearances in telenovelas began with 1960's Vida por Vida, and one of her major roles as a villainess was in La Madrastra opposite Victoria Ruffo and Peregrina. She also starred in Soy Tu Dueña opposite Lucero and Fernando Colunga.  She was married to José María Fernández Unsáin for more than 30 years, from 1967 to his death in 1997. They had one child together, Chantal Andere, who is also an actress.

The two starred in 2002's telenovela La Otra, where Chantal played the younger version of the character her mother played. Jacqueline has been active since 1959. She has been chosen as one of the killers in the popular series Mujeres Asesinas. One of her most famous films was La Casa del Pelícano. She will star as the antagonist in Emilio Larrosa's telenovela: Libre para amarte.

Filmography

Telenovelas 
 La mexicana y el güero as Matilde Rojas Vda. de Salvatorre (2020-2021)  
 Por amar sin ley as Virginia Sánchez Vda. de Ávalos (2018)  
 Las Amazonas as Bernarda Castro Vda. de Mendoza (2016) 
 Libre para amarte as Amelia Lascurain Vda. de Sotomayor (2013) 
 Soy tu dueña as Leonor de Montesinos (2010) 
 Amor sin maquillaje as Herself (2007)
 "Peregrina" as Victoria Contreras Vda. de Alcocer (2005–2006) 
 "La Madrastra" as Alba San Roman (2005) 
 "La Otra" as Bernarda Sáenz Rivas viuda de Guillen (2002) 
 "Mi Destino Eres Tu" as Nuria del Encino de Rivadeneira (2000)
 "Serafin" as Alma de la Luz (1999)
 "Angela" as Emilia Santillana Roldán (1998–1999)
 "Mi querida Isabel" as Clara Riquelme viuda de Marquez (1996–1997)
 "Alondra" as Verónica Real de Díaz (1995)
 "El vuelo del águila" as Carmelita Romero Rubio (1994–1995)
 "Ángeles blancos" as Rocío (1990)
 "Nuevo amanecer" as Laura (1988)
 "El maleficio" as Beatriz de Martino (1983)
 "Quiéreme siempre" as Ana Maria (1981)
 "Sandra y Paulina" as Sandra/Paulina (1980)
 "Pecado de Amor" as Paula/Chantal (1978)
 "Mañana será otro dia" as Mariana (1976)
 "Barata de primavera" as Leticia (1975)
 "Ha llegado una intrusa" as Alicia (1974)
 "Cartas sin destino" as Rosina (1973)
 "Encrucijada" as Wendy Kepler (1970)
 "En busca del paraíso" (1968)
 "Leyendas de México" (1968)
 "Dicha robada" as Ofelia (1967)
 "Amor en el desierto" (1967)
 "Engáñame" (1967)
 "Corazón salvaje" as Aimée Molnar de Duchamp (1966)
 "El derecho de nacer" as Isabel Cristina (1966)
 "La dueña" (1966)
 "El abismo" (1965)
 "Alma de mi alma" (1965)
 "Nuestro barrio" (1965)
 "La vecindad" (1964) as Yolanda 
 "Gabriela" (1964)
 "Siempre tuya" (1964)
 "Agonía de amor" (1963)
 "Cita con la muerte" (1963)
 "Eugenia" (1963)
 "Grandes ilusiones" (1963)
 "El caminante" (1962)
 "Encadenada" as Laura (1962)
 "Janina" (1962)
 "Las momias de Guanajuato" (1962)
 "Sor Juana Inés de la Cruz" (1962)
 "Conflicto" (1961)
 "La leona" (1961)
 "Vida por vida" (1960)

Movies 
 "7 Años de Matrimonio" as Adriana (2013)
 "Héroes verdaderos" 
 "A propósito de Buñuel" as herself (2000)
 "La Señorita" (1993)
 "El Cabezota" (1982)
 "los Japoneses no esperan" (1977)
 "Picardia mexicana" (1977)
 "La Casa del Pelícano" (1976)
 "Simon Blanco" (1974)
 "Separacion matrimonial" as Clara (1973)
 "Con amor de muerte" (1972)
 "Cronica de un amor" (1972)
 "Las Chicas malas del padre Mendez" (1971)
 "Los Enamorados" (1971)
 "La Gatita" (1971)
 "Hoy he soñado con Dios" (1971)
 "El Juego de la guitarra" (1971)
 "Yesenia" as Yesenia (1971)
 "Intimidades de una secretaria" (1971)
 "Nido de fieras" (1971)
 "En esta cama nadie duerme" (1970)
 "Puertas del paraíso" (1970)
 "Trampas de amor" (1970)
 "Los Problemas de mamá" (1970)
 "Almohada para tres" (1969)
 "Bestias jóvenes" (1969)
 "Fallaste corazon" (1969)
 "La Noche violenta" (1969)
 "Quinto patio" (1969)
 "El Día de las madres" (1968)
 "El oficio más antiguo del mundo" (1968)
 "Tres noches de locura" (1968)
 "Vuelo 701" (1968)
 "Un Largo viaje hacia la muerte" (1967)
 "El Zangano" (1967)
 "El Juicio de Arcadio" (1965)
 "Lola de mi vida" (1965)
 "El Ángel Exterminador" as Alicia (1962)
 "El Vestido de novia" (1958)

Theatre 
 Relaciones Peligrosas(Theatrical play) (2012)
 Entre Mujeres (2009)
 Carlota Emperatriz (2007-2008)
 El amor no tiene edad (2000-2002)
 Un tranvia llamado deseo (1983)
 Corona de sombra (1977)
 La vidente (1964)

Dubbing 
 Sanrio World of Animation (1992-1994) 
 Nutcracker Fantasy (1980)

Premios TVyNovelas

 "Trayectoria como actriz" (1997).
 "Una vida de telenovela" (2013).

References

External links

1938 births
Living people
Mexican film actresses
Mexican stage actresses
Mexican telenovela actresses
Mexican voice actresses
20th-century Mexican actresses
21st-century Mexican actresses
Actresses from Mexico City